Fragmenta Entomologica is a peer-reviewed open access scholarly journal publishing entomological research. It is published by Sapienza University of Rome with technical help from PAGEPress. The current editor-in-chief is Paolo Audisio.

Abstracting and indexing 
The journal is abstracted and indexed in:

References

External links 
 

Publications established in 1951
English-language journals
Entomology journals and magazines
Sapienza University of Rome